Ouvrage Berenbach, also known as Ouvrage Behrenbach, is a lesser work (petit ouvrage) of the Maginot Line.  Located in the Fortified Sector of Boulay, the ouvrage is located between gros ouvrage Anzeling and petit ouvrage Bovenberg, facing Germany.  The ouvrage consists of two infantry blocks and one observation block.  Uniquely, the blocks are not connected by subterranean galleries, as is the case in virtually all other Maginot fortifications.

Design and construction
The site was surveyed by CORF (Commission d'Organisation des Régions Fortifiées), the Maginot Line's design and construction agency; Berenbach was approved for construction in August 1930. It was completed at a cost of 11 million francs by the contractor La Parisienne d'Enterprises. The petit ouvrage was planned as an annex to Anzeling.

Description 
Berenbach comprises three separate infantry blocks. Blocks 1 and 2 were planned for the deep underground gallery system to come in Phase 2. Since there was no central usine, each block has its own generating plant.
Block 1: infantry block with two automatic rifle cloches (GFM), one retractable twin machine gun turret, three automatic rifle embrasures, one twin machine gun embrasure and one machine gun/anti-tank gun embrasure (JM/AC47). The block has a shaft excavated to access the gallery system proposed for the second phase, but no staircase in the shaft. Power provided by two 30 hp Renault generators.
Block 2: Infantry block with one GFM cloche, two automatic rifle embrasures, one twin machine gun embrasure and one JM/AC47 embrasure. The block has a shaft excavated to access the gallery system proposed for the second phase, already equipped with a staircase. Power provided by two 8 hp  Renault generators.
Block 3: infantry/observation block with one observation cloche (VDP), one GFM cloche and two automatic rifle embrasures. Power provided by two 8 hp  Renault generators.

Casemates and shelters 
In addition to the combat blocks, a series of detached casemates and infantry shelters surround Berenbach, including

 Abri de Colming: Surface abri-casemate, a unique position in the Maginot Line,  with two GFM cloches and with one JM/AC47 embrasure. The position was sited to control the defensive inundation of Gomelange that protected the low-lying area between Berenbach and Bovenberg.
 Abri de Gomelange: Surface abri with two GFM cloches.

Manning 
The 1940 manning of the ouvrage under the command of Captain Ramaud comprised 97 men and 2 officers of the 162nd Fortress Infantry Regiment. The units were under the umbrella of the 3rd Army, Army Group 2. The Casernement de Bockange provided peacetime above-ground barracks and support services to Berenbach and other positions in the area.

History
See Fortified Sector of Boulay for a broader discussion of the Boulay sector of the Maginot Line.
Berenbach played no significant role in either the Battle of France in 1940 or the Lorraine Campaign of 1944. After the Second World War it became part of the Mòle de Boulay, a strongpoint in the northeastern defenses against Soviet attack.  
Berenbach remained under Army control until after 1971, when it was declassified and sold.

Current condition
The ouvrage has been stripped of much of its equipment and is in poor condition.

See also 
 List of all works on Maginot Line
 Siegfried Line
 Atlantic Wall
 Czechoslovak border fortifications

Notes

References

Bibliography 
Allcorn, William. The Maginot Line 1928-45. Oxford: Osprey Publishing, 2003. 
Kaufmann, J.E. and Kaufmann, H.W. Fortress France: The Maginot Line and French Defenses in World War II, Stackpole Books, 2006. 
Kaufmann, J.E., Kaufmann, H.W., Jancovič-Potočnik, A. and Lang, P. The Maginot Line: History and Guide, Pen and Sword, 2011. 
Mary, Jean-Yves; Hohnadel, Alain; Sicard, Jacques. Hommes et Ouvrages de la Ligne Maginot, Tome 1. Paris, Histoire & Collections, 2001.  
Mary, Jean-Yves; Hohnadel, Alain; Sicard, Jacques. Hommes et Ouvrages de la Ligne Maginot, Tome 2. Paris, Histoire & Collections, 2003.  
Mary, Jean-Yves; Hohnadel, Alain; Sicard, Jacques. Hommes et Ouvrages de la Ligne Maginot, Tome 3. Paris, Histoire & Collections, 2003.  
Mary, Jean-Yves; Hohnadel, Alain; Sicard, Jacques. Hommes et Ouvrages de la Ligne Maginot, Tome 5. Paris, Histoire & Collections, 2009.

External links
 L'ouvrage de Berenbach at alsacemaginot.com 
 Petit ouvrage de Behrenbach at lignemaginot.com 
 Behrenbach (petit ouvrage A26 de) at fortiff.be 

BERE
Maginot Line
Môle de Boulay